Good Things is a music festival held in major cities around Australia.  It features a number of international and Australian music acts, from various genres including rock, metal, punk, and emo. At its inaugural festival, the  headline acts were The Offspring and Stone Sour. In 2019, the headlining acts were Parkway Drive and A Day to Remember.

History
In early-2018, music tour organiser Destroy All Lines announced a new music festival, Good Things. It would become the biggest music festival held in Australia since Soundwave in 2015. The Good Things festival debuted in Melbourne, before playing at Sydney and Brisbane. On 19 November, the New South Wales Police Force issued a statement addressing accusations that they "made it impossible" for the Good Things festival to operate as all-ages in Sydney by imposing "multiple impediments" and charging "exorbitant" policing fees. The next day Destroy All Lines announced that the Sydney festival would no longer be an all-ages event, and it would restricted to 18-and-over. Under-age ticket holders for the Sydney festival were later contacted and given full refunds.

Two weeks before the first festival, Destroy All Lines announced that under-aged ticket holders would have to be accompanied by a responsible adult at the Melbourne festival. The move was met with outrage as festival-goers and parents alike described it as 'unfair'. The Brisbane festival had no restrictions and was an all-ages event. At the Sydney show, during Tonight Alive's set a 46-year-old security guard died due to a suspected heart attack.

Good Things confirmed via their Facebook page that they would be back to host a 2019 festival. On 19 August 2019, organisers announced the dates and venues for Good Things 2019. The Sydney venue was changed to Centennial Park to accommodate more people.

The 2020 festival was cancelled due to the then-ongoing outbreak of COVID-19. Dates were announced for the 2021 festival for 3–5 December in Melbourne, Sydney, and Brisbane. However the 2021 festival was also cancelled from an outbreak of the then-recent COVID-19 Omnicron variant. Dates and the planned lineup still stand for the 2022 festival, which was announced alongside the former's cancellation.

2018

The 2018 Good Things festival was headlined by The Offspring playing their 1994 album Smash in its entirety, and Stone Sour. The festival marked Babymetal's first Australian tour, welcoming one of the biggest crowds of the day.

The 2018 festival was sponsored by Nintendo Switch, Marshall Amplification, Vans, Uppercut Deluxe, Dangerfield, Jack Daniel's, Furphy Ale, Captain Morgan, and Smirnoff.

Locations
 Flemington Racecourse, Melbourne, 7 December 2018
 Parramatta Park, Sydney, 8 December 2018
 Brisbane Showgrounds, Brisbane, 9 December 2018

 The Offspring (USA)
 Stone Sour (USA)
 All Time Low (USA)
 Dropkick Murphys (USA)
 Bullet for My Valentine (UK)
 The Used (USA)
 Babymetal (JPN)
 The Smith Street Band
 Dashboard Confessional (USA)
 Mayday Parade (USA)
 La Dispute (USA)
 Northlane
 The Wonder Years (USA)
 Waterparks (USA)
 Tonight Alive
 Scarlxrd (UK)
 Emmure (USA)
 Palaye Royale (USA/CAN)
 Make Them Suffer
 Waax
 Boston Manor (UK)
 Void of Vision
 Ecca Vandal
 Stuck Out (Melbourne only)
 RedHook (Sydney only)
 Stateside (Brisbane only)

2019

Locations
 Flemington Racecourse, Melbourne, 6 December 2019
 Centennial Park, Sydney, 7 December 2019
 Brisbane Showgrounds, Brisbane, 8 December 2019

Lineup

 Parkway Drive
 A Day to Remember (USA)
 Violent Soho
 Simple Plan (CAN)
 Bad Religion (USA)
 Trivium (USA)
 Skegss
 Simple Creatures (USA)
 Karnivool
 The Butterfly Effect
 The Veronicas
 Coheed And Cambria (USA)
 Falling in Reverse (USA)
 Enter Shikari (UK)
 Dance Gavin Dance (USA)
 Reel Big Fish (USA)
 Poppy (USA)
 Thy Art Is Murder
 Ice Nine Kills (USA)
 The Damned Things (USA)
 Slowly Slowly
 Man with a Mission (JPN)
 The Bennies
 Voyager
 Yours Truly
 Windwaker
 The Beautiful Monument
 Gravemind

Notes
 
A Coheed and Cambria withdrew from the lineup due to sudden health concerns with drummer Josh Eppard.
B The Damned Things withdrew from the lineup due to scheduling conflicts.

2022

The 2022 Good Things festival will be headlined by Bring Me the Horizon and Deftones. The festival marked the reunions of TISM, who performed their first shows since 2004 exclusive only to the festival, and Kisschasy, who played their 2005 album United Paper People in full, their first live shows since 2015. NOFX also played their 1994 album Punk in Drublic in full. The festival marked the debut Australian concerts of Electric Callboy, Nova Twins, and Blood Command.

Locations
 Flemington Racecourse, Melbourne, 2 December 2022
 Centennial Park, Sydney, 3 December 2022
 Brisbane Showgrounds, Brisbane, 4 December 2022

Lineup

 Bring Me the Horizon (UK)
 Deftones (USA)
 NOFX (USA)
 TISM
 The Amity Affliction
 Gojira (FRA)
 One Ok Rock (JPN)
 Sabaton (SWE)
 Polaris
 Millencolin (SWE)
 3OH!3 (USA)
 Blood Command (NOR)
 Chasing Ghosts
 Cosmic Psychos 
 Electric Callboy (GER)
 Fever 333 (USA)
 Jinjer (UKR)
 Jxdn (USA)
 Kisschasy
 Lacuna Coil (ITA)
 Nova Twins (UK)
 Ocean Grove
 Paledusk (JPN)
 RedHook
 Regurgitator
 Sleeping With Sirens (USA)
 Soulfly (USA)
 Teenage Joans
 The Gloom in the Corner
 The Story So Far (USA)
 Thornhill
 Those Who Dream
 To the Grave (Brisbane and Melbourne only)
 You Am I (Melbourne and Sydney only)

Notes
 
AFever 333 withdrew from the lineup due to the sudden departure of several band members.
B3OH!3 withdrew from the lineup due to a dispute with promoters over their allocated set time and were replaced by Ocean Grove.
CJxdn withdrew from the lineup for unknown reasons and was replaced by Teenage Joans.

References

External links
 

Rock festivals in Australia
2018 concert tours
2019 concert tours
Heavy metal festivals in Australia
Summer festivals
Music festivals established in 2018
2018 establishments in Australia